Merijntje Gijzens Jeugd  is a 1936 Dutch drama film directed by Kurt Gerron after the popular novel of the same title by A.M. de Jong.

Cast
Marcel Krols	... 	Merijntje Gijzen
Piet Bron	... 	Goort Perdams, de Kruik
Mimi Boesnach	... 	Janekee
A.M. De Jong	... 	Pastoor
Frida Gonissen	... 	Nelleke - Blozekriekske
Bill Benders... 	Grensjager
Aaf Bouber	... 	Janske
Harry Boda	... 	Flierefluiter
Johan Elsensohn		
Joekie Broedelet	... 	Moeder Gijzen
Kees Brusse	... 	Arjaan Gijzen
Frits Van Dijk	... 	Walter, de schrijver
Jeanne Verstraete	... 	Mevrouw Walter
Pierre Balledux	... 	Veldwachter

External links 
 

1936 films
Dutch black-and-white films
1936 drama films
Dutch drama films